The Roman Catholic Diocese of Gweru is a suffragan diocese in the city of Gweru in the ecclesiastical province of Bulawayo in Zimbabwe.

History
 November 14, 1946: Established as Apostolic Prefecture of Fort Victoria
 June 24, 1950: Promoted as Apostolic Vicariate of Fort Victoria
 January 1, 1955: Promoted as Diocese of Gwelo
 June 25, 1982: Renamed as Diocese of Gweru

Episcopal ordinaries

(all Latin Church)

Prefects Apostolic of Fort Victoria 
 Aloysius Haene (1947 – 24 June 1950)

Vicars Apostolic of Fort Victoria 
 Aloysius Haene (24 June 1950 – 1 January 1955)

Bishops of Gwelo 
 Aloysius Haene (1 January 1955 – 3 February 1977)
 Tobias Wunganayi Chiginya (3 February 1977 – 25 June 1982)

Bishops of Gweru 
 Tobias Wunganayi Chiginya (25 June 1982 – 14 January 1987)
 Francis Xavier Mugadzi (25 October 1988 – 6 February 2004)
 Martin Munyanyi (11 May 2006 – 28 April 2012)
 Xavier Johnsai Munyongani (14 September 2013 – 15 October 2017) (was priest here, 1977–1999, then was incardinated in Díocese of Masvingo)
 Rudolf Nyandoro (24 October 2020 – present)

See also
Catholic Church in Zimbabwe

References

Sources
 GCatholic.org
 

Roman Catholic dioceses in Zimbabwe
Christian organizations established in 1946
Roman Catholic dioceses and prelatures established in the 20th century
Roman Catholic Ecclesiastical Province of Bulawayo